Wsród nocnej ciszy is a Polish motion picture directed by Tadeusz Chmielewski and released in 1978. The screenplay, by Chmielewski, is based on the 1971 novel Příběh kriminálního rady by Ladislav Fuks.

External links
 

1978 films
Polish historical films
1970s Polish-language films
1970s historical films